MŠK Turany is a Slovak football team, based in the town of Turany. The club was founded in 1933. It currently plays in 1. trieda (6th tier in the Slovak football league system).

External links 
www.turany.sk

References

Turany
Association football clubs established in 1933
1933 establishments in Slovakia